Indijk is a former municipality in the Dutch province of Utrecht. It existed from 1817 to 1821, when it was joined to the municipality of Harmelen.

References

Former municipalities of Utrecht (province)